Dankward Buwitt is a German politician of the Christian Democratic Union (CDU) and former member of the German Bundestag.

Life 
Buwitt joined the CDU in 1968 and was local chairman of the Neukölln chapter from 1974 to 1991. He was also district chairman in Neukölln from 1981 to 1997. From 1991 to 1993 he was state treasurer. In 1975 he was elected for the first time to the Berlin House of Representatives, of which he was a member until 1991. In the 1990 federal elections, Buwitt was elected to parliament in constituency 256 (Berlin-Neukölln). He was deputy chairman of the Finance Committee as well as deputy member of the Defence Committee and, since October 1992, of the Special Committee on European Union Affairs. He was re-elected to the constituency in the 1994 Bundestag elections. He did not stand for re-election in the 2002 Bundestag elections.

References

External links 

1939 births
Living people
Members of the Bundestag for Berlin
Members of the Bundestag 1998–2002
Members of the Bundestag 1994–1998
Members of the Bundestag 1990–1994
Members of the Bundestag for the Christian Democratic Union of Germany